A Quien Corresponda (Spanish for "To Whom It May concern") may refer to:

 A quien corresponda, an Argentine novel, written by Martín Caparrós
 A Quien Corresponda, a Mexican TV show funded by Fundación Azteca
 A Quien Corresponda, a Mexican magazine